The Enemy Below is a 1957 DeLuxe Color war film in CinemaScope about a battle between an American destroyer escort and a German U-boat during World War II.  Produced and directed by Dick Powell, the movie stars Robert Mitchum and Curt Jürgens as the American and German commanding officers, respectively. The film was based on the 1956 novel by Denys Rayner, a British naval officer involved in antisubmarine warfare throughout the Battle of the Atlantic.

Plot
The American  USS Haynes detects and attacks a German U-boat (Unterseeboot) that is on its way to rendezvous with a German merchant raider in the South Atlantic Ocean. Lieutenant Commander Murrell, a former officer in the Merchant Marine and now an active-duty officer in the Naval Reserve, has recently taken command of the Haynes, though he is still recovering from injuries incurred in the sinking of his previous ship. Before the U-boat is first spotted, one sailor questions the new captain's fitness and ability.As the battle begins, though, Murrell proves himself a match for wily U-boat Kapitän zur See von Stolberg, a man who is not enamored with the Nazi regime, in a prolonged and deadly battle of wits that tests both men and their crews. Each man grows to respect his opponent.

Murrell skillfully stalks the U-boat and subjects von Stolberg and his crew to hourly depth-charge attacks. In the end, von Stolberg takes advantage of Murrell's predictable pattern of attacks and succeeds in torpedoing the destroyer escort. Although the Haynes is sinking, it is still battle-capable, and Murrell has one final plan; he orders his men to set fires on the deck to make the ship look more damaged than it actually is. He then orders the majority of his crew to evacuate in the lifeboats, but retains a skeleton crew to man the bridge, engine room, and one of his ship's  guns. As Murrell had hoped, von Stolberg surfaces before firing his torpedoes, keeping the deck gun trained on the ship. Murrell orders his gun crew to fire first at the U-boat's stern to immobilize it, and then at the deck gun. Murrell rams the U-boat. With his boat sinking, von Stolberg orders his crew to set scuttling charges and abandon ship.

Murrell, the last man aboard, is about to join his crew in the lifeboats when he spots von Stolberg standing on the conning tower of the sinking U-boat with his injured executive officer Oberleutnant zur See Heini Schwaffer. Murrell tosses a line to the submarine and rescues the pair.  Schwaffer clearly is dying, but von Stolberg refuses to leave his friend behind. Lieutenant Ware returns with American and German sailors in the captain's gig to take the three men off before the U-boat's scuttling charges detonate. Later, aboard a ship that has rescued both crews, the German crew buries Schwaffer at sea as the American crew respectfully watches.

Cast 
 Robert Mitchum as Captain Murrell
 Curd Jürgens as Kapitän zur See von Stolberg
 Theodore Bikel as Oberleutnant zur See "Heinie" Schwaffer, von Stolberg's second in command
 David Hedison as Lieutenant Ware, the executive officer of Haynes (as Al Hedison)
 Russell Collins as Doctor
 Kurt Kreuger as von Holem
 Frank Albertson as Lieutenant (junior grade) Crain
 Biff Elliot as Quartermaster Robbins
 Ralph Manza as Lieutenant Bonelli (uncredited)
 Doug McClure as Ensign Merry (uncredited)
 Darryl F. Zanuck as Chief (uncredited)

Production

Writing
The screenplay, which was adapted by Wendell Mayes, differs substantially from the original book. In the novel, the ship is British, but in the film, it is American. The screenplay's final scenes of mutual respect between the protagonists are not taken from the book. In the book, the destroyer captain takes a swing at the U-boat captain while they are in the lifeboat because the U-boat captain claims that the destroyer crewmen are his prisoners. The film also vaguely alludes to evil as such (or the devil), not specifically the Nazis, being the "enemy" ("You cut off one head and it grows another..."). This gives the title of The Enemy Below a double meaning not present in the book.

The screenplay has historical precedence. On 6 May 1944, which was the lead ship of the same destroyer escort class portrayed in The Enemy Below, actually rammed and sank a U-boat in combat before capturing many of the German crew.

Casting
The anti-Nazi U-boat captain was portrayed by actor Curd Jürgens, who had been an actual critic of Nazism in his native Germany. In 1944, after filming Wiener Mädeln, he got into an argument with Robert Kaltenbrunner (brother of high-ranking Austrian SS official Ernst Kaltenbrunner), SS-Obersturmbannführer Otto Skorzeny, and a member of Baldur von Schirach's staff in a Viennese bar without knowing who they were. Jürgens was arrested and sent to a labor camp for the "politically unreliable" in Hungary. After a few weeks, he managed to escape and went into hiding. Jürgens became an Austrian citizen after the war.

Many of the actual ship's crew appear in the film, such as the phone talkers, the gun and depth charge crews, and all of the men seen abandoning ship. The Whitehursts commanding officer, Lieutenant Commander Walter Smith, played the engineering officer. He is the man seen reading comics (Little Orphan Annie) during the lull before the action while an enlisted man is reading The Decline and Fall of the Roman Empire. The Whitehurst was sunk as a target in 1971.

Filming
Despite being set in the South Atlantic, filming took place in the Pacific Ocean near Oahu, Hawaii.

Music
The tune sung by the U-boat crew on the ocean floor between depth-charge attacks is from an 18th-century march called "Der Dessauer Marsch," known by the first line of lyrics as "So leben wir" ("That's how we live"). The burial hymn in the final scene is "Ich hatt' einen Kameraden",

Awards and nominations
For the audio effects, Walter Rossi received the 1958 Academy Award for Best Special Effects. The film was also awarded as the best sound-edited feature of 1957 by the Motion Picture Sound Editors.

In popular culture
 The 1966 Star Trek episode "Balance of Terror" is closely based on the film, with the USS Enterprise cast as the destroyer and the Romulan vessel, using a cloaking device, as the U-boat.
 Nicholas Meyer has cited the film as an inspiration for The Wrath of Khan.
 The Voyage to the Bottom of the Sea episode "Killers of the Deep" reused substantial amounts of footage from the film. David Hedison (then Al Hedison), who played Lieutenant Ware, the executive officer of the Haynes, also played Commander Lee Crane on Voyage to the Bottom of the Sea.
 In the 1995 film Crimson Tide, two USS Alabama officers debate about the cast of The Enemy Below.

See also
 List of American films of 1957
 USS Borie (DD-215) the real U-Boat Destroyer story

References

Further reading
 Rayner, D.A., The Enemy Below, London: Collins 1956

External links
 
 
 
 
 

1957 films
1957 war films
American war films
Films based on British novels
Films directed by Dick Powell
Films that won the Best Visual Effects Academy Award
20th Century Fox films
CinemaScope films
U-boat fiction
Films about the United States Navy in World War II
World War II submarine films
Films with screenplays by Wendell Mayes
Films about the United States Navy
Films scored by Leigh Harline
1950s English-language films
1950s American films